Marie-Thérèse Le Chêne MBE CdG (born 20 April 1890, Sedan, France) was an agent of the United Kingdom's clandestine organization, the Special Operations Executive (SOE), in France during the Second World War. She was the oldest female SOE agent sent to France, serving there from 31 October 1942 until 16 August 1943. She worked as a courier with the code name of Adele. Her husband and brother-in-law were also SOE agents and she worked closely with them.

Early life 
Little about Le Chêne's early life is included in her SOE file. Her birth name is not recorded.  She was born in 1890, although some sources say 1887.  She was the oldest of three children. Early in World War II, she fled France for London with her husband Henri and brother-in-law, Pierre. In London she worked as a cook and manager in a hotel. Her husband, although born in France, was a British citizen who had managed a hotel in Nairobi, Kenya.

World War II
At the outbreak of the war, she refused to join the Charles de Gaulle's resistance organization and joined the Special Operations Executive on 16 May 1942 despite being aged 52. Her husband and brother-in-law were already in SOE and had departed England for France a few weeks earlier. Le Chêne was one of the first female agents, along with Andrée Borrel, Blanche Charlet, and Yvonne Rudellat, to be trained by SOE in Britain.

On the night of 3/4 November 1942 she was landed by boat at Port Miou, near Cassis in southern France, with SOE agents George Starr, organiser of WHEELWRIGHT; Mary Herbert, courier for SCIENTIST; and Odette Sansom courier for SPINDLE. She joined her husband, Henri, organiser (leader) of the SPRUCE network in Lyon. Le Chêne began as courier for the SPRUCE network, and her role changed to the distribution of political pamphlets and anti-German leaflets as far as Marseille.

During a visit to Clermont-Ferrand she discovered that the workers at the Michelin factory were sabotaging production and delivering inferior tyres to the Germans. 

In January 1943 Henri Le Chêne considered that listening to the BBC in France meant that the distribution of leaflets had lost its utility, and fled the country via the Pyrenees, but was jailed in Spain. Too tired to join him in the rigorous crossing of the Pyrenees, Marie-Thérèse Le Chêne hid in friends' homes and was evacuated by the SOE from Angers on 19 August 1943. Back in England, she rejoined her husband who had escaped from a Spanish jail.

References

External sources
MRD Foot, SOE in France an account of the work of the British Special Operations Executive in France, 1940–1944, HMSO, London, 1966.
Bernard O'Connor, Blackmail Sabotage: Attacks on French industries during World War Two, lulu.com, 2016
Peter Jacobs, Setting France Ablaze: The SOE in France During WWII, Pen and Sword, 2015
Beryl E. Escott, SOE Heroines, Versailles, Omblage, 2018

French Special Operations Executive personnel
French Resistance members
1890 births
Year of death missing